Pallidin is a protein that in humans is encoded by the PLDN gene.

Function 

The protein encoded by this gene may play a role in intracellular vesicle trafficking. It interacts with Syntaxin 13 which mediates intracellular membrane fusion. Several alternatively spliced transcript variants of this gene have been described, but the full-length nature of some of these variants has not been determined.

Interactions 

PLDN has been shown to interact with:
 BLOC1S1, 
 BLOC1S2, 
 CNO, 
 Dysbindin, 
 MUTED, 
 SNAPAP, and
 STX12.

References

Further reading